Insurgentes is a station on the Line 1 of Mexico City Metro. It is located within the Glorieta de los Insurgentes at the intersection of Avenida  de los Insurgentes and Avenida Chapultepec in Mexico City's Cuauhtémoc borough, close to the Zona Rosa shopping and entertainment district and the Colonia Roma, two of the most iconic neighborhoods in the city. In 2019, the station had an average ridership of 65,134 passengers per day, making it the 12th busiest station in the network.

Name and pictogram
Insurgentes receives its name from Avenida de los Insurgentes, one of Mexico City's most important thoroughfares, the station is located under the intersection of Insurgentes and Avenida Chapultepec.

The station pictogram depicts the church bell of Dolores Hidalgo, a symbol of the start of the Mexican War of Independence (1810) and the eleven-year-long insurgency that followed.

General information
Metro Insurgentes was built in a particular style. Surrounding the station is a circular shopping mall-cum-plaza, called the Glorieta de los Insurgentes. The station's exterior walls are intended to evoke pre-Hispanic architecture, while the platform walls are decorated with mock-ups of platforms from the Paris Métro and the London Underground. The station was opened on 5 September 1969.  Exterior shots of the plaza and metro entrance were used in the 1990 motion picture Total Recall.

This is an important station for bus transfers, connecting with an extensive local network of urban buses (RTP, or Red de Transporte de Pasajeros) that serves zones like Villa Olímpica and Tlalpan, south of the city, and Metro Indios Verdes, north of the city. The Insurgentes Metrobús bus rapid transit line also has a stop in the vicinity of Metro Insurgentes.

In recent years, the Glorieta de los Insurgentes (and, therefore, the station itself), has been a meeting and starting point for some social and political rallies; for example, in December 2019, it was used as meeting point for several feminist rallies.

The station serves the following neighborhoods: Colonia Juárez and Colonia Roma Norte.

Nearby
Glorieta de los Insurgentes, roundabout with a small plaza and commerces.
Zona Rosa, neighborhood known for its shopping, nightlife, gay community and Korean community.
Plaza Río de Janeiro, square.
Fuente de Cibeles, replica of the fountain located in the Plaza de Cibeles in Madrid.

Exits
Southwest: Oaxaca street, Colonia Roma Norte
Southeast: Avenida de los Insurgentes, Colonia Roma Norte
South: Jalapa street, Colonia Roma Norte
Northeast: Avenida Chapultepec, Colonia Juárez
North: Genova street, Colonia Juárez
Northwest: Avenida Chapultepec, Colonia Juárez

Station layout

Ridership

Gallery

References

External links
 

Mexico City Metro Line 1 stations
Mexico City Metro stations in Cuauhtémoc, Mexico City
Railway stations opened in 1969
1969 establishments in Mexico
Colonia Roma
Accessible Mexico City Metro stations